PLANT Architect Inc. is a Toronto based interdisciplinary firm founded in 1994 by Chris Pommer, Lisa Rapoport and Mary Tremain. Areas of practice for this firm include; architecture, landscape architecture, installation art and much more. With a multidisciplinary background and approach that focuses on design at a variety of scales, PLANT Architect seeks to create design that responds to the overlaps between these areas.

Founders 
The founding team consists of Chris Pommer, Lisa Rapoport and Mary Tremain. They cofounded PLANT Architect in 1994 with the intention of forming an interdisciplinary firm that collaborates and works in many areas of design.

Chris Pommer graduated from the University of Waterloo in 1988. He worked with Ferguson Ferguson Architects before cofounding PLANT. He has also worked with Bruce Mau Design in Toronto as a Senior Designer and has lectured and taught in universities. Universities in which he has lectured and taught include; University of Toronto, University of Waterloo, and University of Manitoba.

Lisa Rapoport - another founding member of the firm - also graduated from the University of Waterloo in 1988. After graduating, she worked for many Toronto firms, and became was  a professor at the University of Waterloo and a visiting professor at the Illinois Institute of Technology in Chicago.

The third founding partner of the firm is Mary Tremain. She graduated from the University of Waterloo in 1986 with a Bachelor of Honours in Architecture. Before founding PLANT, she oversaw a lot of different types of projects from realms of landscape to architecture. She has also been a professor at the University of Toronto.

Notable competitions 
Some notable competition wins include the following:

References 

Architecture firms of Canada